Union Biblical Seminary (UBS) is a theological seminary founded by  Wesleyan and Methodist denominations in Pune, India. UBS started as a Marathi-medium Bible School opened by the Free Methodist Church and was finally established in 1953 and initially located in Yavatmal, before relocating to Pune in 1983. It is affiliated with the Senate of Serampore College (University). It is the largest seminary under Wesleyan-Holiness movement in India. The seminary is famous for contextualising theology to Indian post-colonial context and in promoting New Perspective on Paul,  Evangelical feminism or egalitarianism, Dalit theology and progressive Wesleyan  viewpoint.

Union Biblical Seminary is founded by Union Biblical Seminary Association, a trust formed by various evangelical denominations in India. Union Biblical Seminary Association changed its name to Union Biblical Seminary Society in 2016. Rev. Vijayesh Lal serves as the Chairperson.

Courses offered 
The following are the courses offered by the Union Biblical Seminary

 Bachelor of Divinity (B.Div.)
 Master of Theology (Th.M.) in Old Testament, New Testament Theology, Ministry and Mission
 Doctor of Theology (Th.D.) in Old Testament, New Testament and Theology
 Bachelor of Theology (Th.B.) in Marathi, Hindi and English
 Master of Divinity (M.Div.) in Hindi and English
 Diploma in Counselling

Publications 
 UBS Journal, with three releases in a year.

Library 
The Seminary has a large library

Important Alumni
S. Anungla

References

External links

Christian seminaries and theological colleges in India
Educational institutions established in 1953
Universities and colleges in Pune
Seminaries and theological colleges affiliated to the Senate of Serampore College (University)
1953 establishments in Bombay State